William Charles Simmons (February 28, 1865 – August 24, 1956) was a Canadian politician and judge from Alberta.

Early life 
William Charles Simmons was born on February 28, 1865, in the farming community of Tara, Ontario, to William Simmons and Jane Wilson. Simmons attended the University of Toronto and completed a Bachelor of Arts in 1895. Simmons married Mary W. Wilson on August 7, 1899, and moved west to Alberta to become a principal in Lethbridge. Simmons resigned from teaching to article with R. B. Bennett in Calgary and passed the bar in the North-West Territories on August 12, 1900. Simmons was employed as a Crown prosecutor in Lethbridge from 1903 to 1904.

Political life 

Simmons was a member of the Legislative Assembly of Alberta from 1906 to 1908 for the Alberta Liberal Party. He was elected in a by-election after Leverett DeVeber was appointed to the Senate of Canada. He resigned in 1908 to run for the House of Commons of Canada for Medicine Hat. He was defeated by the former Northwest Territories MLA Charles Alexander Magrath.

Alberta Supreme Court 

Simmons was appointed to the Supreme Court of Alberta on October 12, 1910, and was appointed the Chief Justice on August 27, 1924.

References

External links 
 

Alberta Liberal Party MLAs
Candidates in the 1908 Canadian federal election
1865 births
1956 deaths
Liberal Party of Canada candidates for the Canadian House of Commons
Judges in Alberta
People from Bruce County
University of Toronto alumni